Resan Hanım ("softness" or "bright"; 28 March 1860 – 31 March 1910)  was a consort of Sultan Murad V of the Ottoman Empire.

Biography
Resan Hanım was born on 28 March 1860 in Artvin in the Caucasus. She was Georgian, daughter of Ömer Bey and Fatma Hanım, and she had two sisters named Şayeste Hanım and Rabia Gülten Hanım. Her real name was Ayşe Hanim. She and sisters were sent to Istanbul as ladies-in-waiting for Seniha Sultan, Murad V's half-sister. Resan was chosen by Seniha as a consort for Murad and she was presented to Murad by the Senior Kalfa as a gift on the occasion of his accession to the throne. After his deposition, she followed him into confinement in the Çırağan Palace.

She married Murad on 2 November 1877 in the Çırağan Palace when Murad was thirty-seven years old and Resan was seventeen years old, a year after Murad and his family's imprisonment in the palace. On 19 June 1879, a year after the marriage, she gave birth to Fatma Sultan, followed by Aliye Sultan, born on 24 August 1880. Aliye died on 17 September 1903.

She was widowed at Murad's death in 1904, after which her ordeal in the Çırağan Palace came to an end. After Murad's death he stayed for a few years at Çırağan Palace to keep company with Şayan Kadın, Murad's third consort, who refused to leave the Palace. During the Second Constitutional Era she asked to be allowed to move to Yildiz Palace, but was denied. Instead, on 16  December 1908, she was allowed to move in with her daughter Fatma. She died on 31 March 1910 at the age of fifty because tuberculosis, and was buried in the mausoleum of Damat Mehmed Ali Pasha in Eyüp Cemetery, Istanbul.

Issue

In literature
 Resan is a character in Ayşe Osmanoğlu's historical novel The Gilded Cage on the Bosphorus (2020).

See also
Ottoman Imperial Harem
List of consorts of the Ottoman sultans

References

Sources

1860 births
1910 deaths
19th-century consorts of Ottoman sultans
20th-century consorts of Ottoman sultans